ASY or Asy may mean:
 ASY, The Finnish Asperger Association, Finland
 ASY, IATA code for Ashley Municipal Airport, Ashley, North Dakota, United States
 ASY, National Rail code for Ashley railway station, Ashley, Cheshire, England
 asy, ISO 639-3 code for the Yaosakor dialect of the Asmat language of West Papua
 Asy, Kazakhstan, a village and the administrative center of Jambyl District, Jambyl
 Annual sustainable yield in fisheries
 ASY, the Haskins articulatory synthesizer (software)
 ASy, designation of one of the G-6 Messerschmitt Bf 109 variants
 Asy, preferred name of Asya Saavedra, singer, keyboardist and songwriter of the girl band Smoosh

See also
 Eman El-Asy, Egyptian actress
Asi, an alternate name for the Ossetians